VTV9 is TV Channel country region Southern Vietnam.  Channel VTV9 is broadcast with a duration of 24 hours a day, with rich content including programs news, categories, sports, entertainment built  based on the materials and tastes of the audience in Southern Vietnam.

History

VTV9 (old) 
 October 8, 2007: Launched channel VTV9 with broadcast duration from 06h00 to 24h00 daily. VTV9 is broadcast on the Vietnamese Cable Television system (VCTV) in Ho Chi Minh City, analog broadcast with the transmitter system located near Ben Thanh market.  At that time, like other regional TV channels, VTV9 was the main official broadcaster in Ho Chi Minh City,  the South East and the North Hau River.
 September 13, 2010: VTV9 channel was officially broadcast nationwide.
 01/01/2011: Channel VTV9 broadcasts with duration from 06h00 to 24h00 daily.
 11/07/2013: The channel is broadcast with a duration of 24 hours daily.
 August 28, 2015: Broadcasting channel VTV9 HD on the system Vietnam Cable Television (VTVCab), becoming TV channel  Saturday of Vietnam Television broadcast in HD.
 September 29, 2015: VTV9 HD channel is broadcast nationwide through the system Digital terrestrial television DVB-T2 by VTV  transmission and is broadcast on many other infrastructure television.
 01/01/2016: Officially broadcasting VTV9 - TV Channel Country to the audience Southern with unchanged broadcast time, on the basis of merger  The 2 regional channels are VTV9 (version 1) and VTV Can Tho 1 (according to the National Press Planning Project to 2025 of the Ministry of Information and Communications).

VTV Can Tho 1 
 
Formerly Can Tho Television Station was established on November 11, 1968. This is the second television station of Vietnam (including both South and North).  The first television station of Vietnam was Saigon Television Station, established in 1965.
 After the day of unification of Vietnam, Can Tho Television Station also quickly went into operation (May 2, 1975), in order to promptly respond to the audiovisual and cultural and spiritual life of the people of the Mekong Delta.  .
 In 1990, television in Can Tho had 2 broadcast channels: channel 11 VHF (today's THTPCT) and channel 6 VHF (CVTV1 - VTV Can Tho 1).
 The team of technical staff and engineers of Can Tho Television Station at that time embarked on the design of converting the broadcasting system and central equipment from the FCC system left by the Republic of Vietnam regime to the new system.  OIRT.  The Information Regiment of Military Zone 9 supported electronic components to design mobile video recorders and mobile video recorders for the unit.  After that, the station's technical staff continued to design and convert from OIRT system to color broadcast SECAM III B and to PAL - DK system, the device also gradually switched to UMATIC and BETACAM broadcast.
 In 1988, many devices began to switch to SDI 4:2:2 uncompressed digital and MPEG II 4:2:0 compressed digital television systems.
 From 1983 to 1984, the unit sent officers and engineers to help establish Cambodia National Television Station, build a system from the center to broadcast, and train the station for technical staff and reporters.
 In 1984, Can Tho television also helped Da Nang television to switch from OIRT to broadcast SECAM III B. These years, it was also the time when radio and television stations in the Southwest provinces began to form.  Can Tho Television is also responsible for sending a team of technical staff to help local stations install central equipment, transmitters, and help train reporters, editors, etc.
1992: Can Tho regional television station, affiliated to Vietnam Television Station, supports broadcasting on channel 6, the initial logo is THCT.
1997: Changed the logo from THCT to CTV.
January 1, 2004: Changed the identity of Vietnam Television Center in Can Tho City, from CTV to CVTV.
2010: VTV Can Tho changed the frequency channel and transmitter of VTV channel Can Tho 1, from channel 6 VHF to channel 49 UHF (the location of channel VTV3 broadcast in Can Tho before 2010).
June 5, 2011: Changed the identity from CVTV1 to VTV Can Tho 1.
In 2013: Increase the broadcast time of VTV Can Tho 1 channel to 24/24h.
January 1, 2016: Following the National Press Planning Project to 2025, the national television channel in the Southern region - VTV9 (new) is a sign for channel merger.  VTV9 (old) with VTV Can Tho 1.

VTV9 (new) 
 
 01/01/2016: Officially broadcasting VTV9 - TV Channel Country to the audience Southern with unchanged broadcast time, on the basis of merger  The 2 regional channels are VTV9 (version 1) and VTV Can Tho 1 (according to the National Press Planning Project to 2025 of the Ministry of Information and Communications).
 From March 19, 2020, to the end of April 30, 2020, due to the influence of the COVID-19 pandemic, channel VTV9 broadcasts from 05h00 to 24h00.  From May 1, 2020, channel VTV9 broadcasts again 24 hours a day.
May 10, 2020: Vietnam Television Center at Ho Chi Minh City, Can Tho and Nha Trang merged into Vietnamese Television Regional Center Southern according to Decree 34/2020/ND-CP  (issued on March 18, 2020) of Government, present in all the main and most important areas in Southern such as Ho Chi Minh City, Can Tho and Nha Trang, led by Mr. Lam Van Tu as the center's Director.

Broadcast time
 October 8, 2007 - September 12, 2010:
 5:30am to 12:00pm and 5:00pm to 12:00am (satelite).
 5:30am to 12:00am (cable).
 September 13 - December 31, 2010: 5:30am to 12:00am.
 January 1, 2011 - July 10, 2013: 6:00am to 12:00am.
 July 11, 2013 - present: 24 hours per day.
 March 19 - April 30, 2020: 5:00am to 12:00am.

Programmes

See also
Television and mass media in Vietnam
Vietnam Television
Ho Chi Minh City

References

 

 
Television stations in Vietnam
2007 establishments in Vietnam
Television channels and stations established in 2007